The Women's giant slalom competition of the Innsbruck 1964 Olympics was held at Axamer Lizum.

The defending world champion was Marianne Jahn of Austria.

The final results saw the second ever occurrence of female siblings on the same individual's event Olympic podium, with French sisters Marielle Goitschel (gold) and Christine Goitschel (silver) repeating (in reverse order) their top two finish in the slalom two days earlier.

Results

References 

Women's giant slalom
Alp
Oly